Danfeng may refer to:

Danfeng County, in Shangluo, Shaanxi, China
Danfeng Station, station on Taipei Rapid Transit System, located in Taipei County, Taiwan